The World Allround Speed Skating Championships for Men took place on 11 and 12 February 1989 in Oslo at the Valle Hovin ice rink.

Title holder was the American Eric Flaim.

Classification

  DNS = Did not start

Source:

References

World Allround Speed Skating Championships, 1989
1989 World Allround

Attribution
In Dutch